A gubernatorial election was held on 13 June 1976 to elect the Governor of , the prefecture is the southernmost and westernmost prefecture of Japan.

Chōbyō Yara, governor since 1968 is not seeking reelection.

Candidates 

Kōichi Taira, 64, endorsed by the union of the left (Progress and Unity), including the OSMP, JSP and JCP.  
Asato Tsumichiyo, 72, member of the DSP, backed by LDP.

Results

References 

1976 elections in Japan
Okinawa gubernatorial elections